Claude-Aimé Chenavard (1798 – 16 June 1838) was a French decorative painter and draughtsman and was born at Lyons in 1798. He published Nouveau Recueil de Decorations intérieures, 1833–1835, and Album de L'Ornemaniste, 1835. He died in Paris in 1838 and was buried in Père Lachaise Cemetery.

References
 

1798 births
1838 deaths
Artists from Lyon
19th-century French painters
French male painters
French draughtsmen
Burials at Père Lachaise Cemetery
19th-century French male artists
18th-century French male artists